Spy Hook is a 1988 spy novel by Len Deighton. It is the first novel in the second of three trilogies about Bernard Samson, a middle-aged and somewhat jaded intelligence officer working for the British Secret Intelligence Service (MI6). Spy Hook is part of the Hook, Line and Sinker  trilogy, being succeeded by Spy Line and Spy Sinker. This trilogy is preceded by the Game, Set and Match trilogy and followed by the final Faith, Hope and Charity trilogy. Deighton's novel Winter (1987) is a prequel to the nine novels, covering the years 1900-1945 and providing the backstory to some of the characters.

Plot summary
The novel begins with Bernard Sampson visiting his old friend and ex-SIS colleague in Washington named Jim Prettyman as part of an investigation regarding some missing funds. Soon after, Prettyman is murdered in a mugging.

All his allies start losing interest in the investigation, and after digging deeper Bernard is sent to America once again, where it is revealed that Bret Rensselaer has not indeed died (as hinted at the end of the first trilogy, and discussed in this book) but is in fact in rehabilitation. Bernard returns to Europe, where he confronts a man called "Dodo" and is saved from an untimely death by Prettyman, who it turns out has gone under "deep-cover".

Bernard then takes his evidence to the Director General, who in a surprise turn of events orders his arrest, which thanks to some quick thinking by Werner Volkmann, Bernard evades for the while.

The novel concludes with Bernard seeking an explanation from Frank Harrington, before disappearing into the night.

1988 British novels
Bernard Samson novels
Hutchinson (publisher) books